Macherla Assembly constituency is a constituency in Palnadu district of Andhra Pradesh, representing the state legislative assembly in India. It is one of the seven assembly segments of Narasaraopet Lok Sabha constituency, along with Pedakurapadu, Chilakaluripet, Narasaraopet, Sattenapalle, Vinukonda and Gurajala. Ramakrishna Reddy Pinnelli is the present MLA of the constituency, who won the 2019 Andhra Pradesh Legislative Assembly election from Yuvajana Sramika Rythu Congress Party. As of 25 March 2019, there are a total of 250,330 electors in the constituency.

Mandals

Members of Legislative Assembly Macherla

Election results

Assembly elections 2019

Assembly elections 2014

Assembly  Bye-elections 2012

Assembly Elections 2009

Assembly Elections 2004

Assembly elections 1999

Assembly elections 1994

Assembly elections 1989

Assembly elections 1985

Assembly elections 1983

Assembly elections 1978

Assembly elections 1972

Assembly elections 1967

Assembly elections 1962

Assembly elections 1955

See also
 List of constituencies of Andhra Pradesh Legislative Assembly

References

Assembly constituencies of Andhra Pradesh